The Green Party of the United States held primaries in several states in 2012. Jill Stein won most of the primaries and was formally nominated as the party's nominee during the 2012 Green National Convention.

Candidates

Schedule

†Gray indicates that the primary, caucus, or convention has occurred but the official results have not yet been released.

Results

Results by state

Ohio Convention (February 5)
The Ohio Green Party Convention took place on February 5.

Illinois primary (February 24)

The Illinois Green Party Convention took place on February 24.

Arizona primary (February 29)
The Arizona Green Party held its primary on February 29.

Wisconsin primary (March 3)
The Wisconsin primary took place on March 3.

Massachusetts primary (March 6)
The Massachusetts primary took place on March 6. Three candidates appeared on the ballot.

Virginia primary (March 11)
The Virginia Green Party held its primary on March 11.

New Jersey convention (March 18)
The New Jersey Green Party Convention took place on March 18.

Colorado convention (March 31)
The Colorado Green Party Convention took place on March 31.

DC Primary (April 3)
The DC Statehood Party Primary took place on April 3.

Connecticut convention (April 28)
The Connecticut Green Party Convention took place on April 28.

South Carolina convention (April 28)
The South Carolina Green Party Convention took place on April 28.

Maine Caucuses (May 5)
The Maine Green Party held caucuses, and the state meeting took place on May 5.

Rhode Island convention (May 6)
The Rhode Island Green Party Convention took place on May 6.

Arkansas convention (May 6)
The Arkansas Green Party Convention took place on May 6.

Delaware convention (May 12)
The Delaware Green Party Convention took place on May 12 in Newark, Delaware.

Hawaii convention (May 19)
The Hawaii Green Party Convention took place on May 19.

Minnesota Caucuses (May 19)
The Minnesota Green Party Caucuses took place on May 19.

Mississippi convention (May 19)
The Mississippi Green Party Convention took place on May 19.

New York convention (May 19)
The New York Green Party Convention took place on May 19.

Pennsylvania convention (May 19)
The Pennsylvania Green Party convention took place on May 19.

Tennessee convention (May 19)
The Tennessee Green Party convention took place on May 19.

Florida primary (May 27)
The Florida Green Party primary took place on May 27.

Iowa primary (May 27)
The Iowa Green Party primary took place on May 27.

Washington Convention (May 27)
The Washington Green Party Convention took place on May 27.

Georgia convention (June 2)
The Georgia Green Party convention took place on June 2.

Oregon convention (June 2)
The Pacific Green Party convention took place on June 2. The members voted using a ranked choice system, but only two candidates received votes so it stayed in one round.

Michigan convention (June 3)
The Michigan Green Party convention took place on June 3.

California primary (June 5)
The California Primary took place on June 5. Three candidates appeared on the ballot.

References